Shcherbynivka is an urban-type settlement in the Bakhmut Raion, Donetsk Oblast (province) of eastern Ukraine. Population:

Demographics
Native language as of the Ukrainian Census of 2001:
 Ukrainian 91.24%
 Russian 8.62%
 Moldovan (Romanian) 0.05%
 Belarusian 0.02%

References

Urban-type settlements in Bakhmut Raion